Pachnoda prasina is a beetle belonging to the family Scarabaeidae. This species can be found in São Tomé and Príncipe and in Guinea.

References
 Biolib
 Global species

Cetoniinae
Beetles of Africa
Beetles described in 1881